Pushpika was model who has won the titles of Miss Sri Lanka 2011 and Mrs Sri Lanka. But later her Mrs Sri Lanka title was removed as she submitted the fault information for Mrs world Eligibility Criteria For Mrs. World Competition. She violated  the criteria where "Contestants should be married as of the date of entry of the competition."

She was separated from her former husband couple of years back and her divorce case was ongoing on the last stage during the time she applied for the contest.  

On the night of 4 April 2021, the grand finale of the Mrs. Sri Lanka 2021 pageant was held at the Nelum Pokuna Mahinda Rajapakse Theater in Colombo. The event was partially telecast live via Rupavahini, which is one of Sri Lanka's main national television channels. The competition ended in bizarre fashion when Pushpika De Silva, the contestant who was initially crowned as Mrs. Sri Lanka 2021 unceremoniously had her crown forcibly removed from her head on stage by the previous title holder, Caroline Jurie, who stated that De Silva should be disqualified for being a divorcee, something De Silva denied. The incident sparked social media reaction and wide media attention. Despite the incident, Sri Lanka was announced as the host country for the 2021 Mrs. World Pageant. De Silva was reinstated as the legitimate winner of the Mrs. Sri Lanka 2021 competition and therefore was eligible to compete at the Miss World 2021 beauty contest .

Mrs Sri Lanka

Development 
Pushpika stated on her Facebook account that she was recovering from head injuries after being hospitalised and she denied claims that she was a divorcee. It was reported that Pushpika is currently separated from her partner for personal reasons. She threatened legal action against those who insulted her during the grand finale of the competition. The organisers of the Mrs. Sri Lanka event apologised for the incident and ensured that the crown and cash prize would be presented back to Pushpika De Silva. On 6 April 2021, the organisers returned the crown and prize to De Silva issuing apology regarding the controversy.
 
Mrs. World Inc indicated that it deeply regretted Jurie's conduct and warned of investigations to determine further possible actions against Jurie.

After the incident, Pushpika De Silva's husband stated in a Facebook post that he had not been involved with Pushpika for the past four years and they are finalizing their divorce. The Daily Mirror article lists that De Silva's case has been fixed in court for June or July 2021.

On 8 April 2021, Caroline Jurie and runner-up Chula Padmendra were arrested by the police, and questioned. They were arrested based on three separate counts. However, both of them were released on bail later on the same day.

After being released on bail, Jurie posted an Instagram video in which she defended her decision and mentioned that she is ready to pass on her Mrs. World crown.

Chula Padmendra mentioned in an interview that there were no auditors and translators in the Mrs. Sri Lanka 2021 pageant, and not all contestants were treated equally on stage due to a favoritism scandal as seen by witnesses and other evidence. The scandal will be presented in an upcoming court case in regards to this incident.

The Mrs World organization announced later in April that Kate Schneider from Ireland, who was the first runner-up when Jurie won the title, was the winner following Jurie's voluntary resignation as Mrs. World. Jurie remains as a former Mrs. World and was listed in the official booklet of Mrs World 2022.This was confirmed by Vice president of Mrs World Tana Johnson in an interview with a news paper in Sri Lanka.  

Pushpika De Silva was officially stripped of her title on 8 February 2022 on grounds of 'serious violation of the discipline and the ethical standards expected of a beauty queen.'

References 

2021 in Sri Lanka
2021 controversies
Beauty pageant controversies
Beauty pageants in Sri Lanka
Sri Lanka 2021 controversy
2021 disasters in Sri Lanka